is a passenger railway station located in the city of Imabari, Ehime Prefecture, Japan. It is operated by JR Shikoku and has the station number "Y43".

Lines
Connections with other local or limited express trains are needed to travel further east or west along the line.

Layout
The station, which is unstaffed, consists of a side platform and an island platform serving two tracks. A passing loop runs along the other side of the island platform. The station building is unstaffed and serves only as a waiting room. A footbridge on the outside of the station premises links to the island platform and to the street on the other side of the tracks, allowing passengers to access the station platforms from streets on either side of the tracks.

Adjacent stations

History
On 1 October 1959, the station, now being operated by JGR's successor, Japanese National Railways (JNR), was renamed Ōnishi Station. With the privatization of JNR on 1 April 1987, control of the station passed to JR Shikoku.

Surrounding area
Myōkensan Kofun is located 15 minutes on foot from the station.
Imabari City Hall Onishi Branch (former Onishi Town Office)
Imabari Municipal Onishi Elementary School
Imabari Municipal Onishi Junior High Schoo

See also
 List of railway stations in Japan

References

External links

Station timetable

Yosan Line
Railway stations in Ehime Prefecture
Railway stations in Japan opened in 1924
Imabari, Ehime